Landsfort Herle was a fortification with moat in, what now is, the centre of Heerlen, Netherlands (roughly the current Pancratiusplein), it was probably built by the counts van Ahr-Hochstaden (also referred to as Here van Are) The name Landsfort (‘fort of the land’) comes from the fact that the fortification come under the responsibility of the land. In the 13th century Heerlen, and thus also Landsfort Herle, come into the possession of the Dukes of Brabant, the Landsfort was (re)built by the Dukes of Brabant in 1244.

The wall is believed to be one of the oldest still recognisable in the Netherlands, part is now being excavated.

A marquette of the fort was constructed from a map from 1787 found while the Pancratiuskerk was heavily reconstructed in the 1960s. The fort had three gates and had two towers (the bell tower of the church and the Schelmentoren, both with 2 metre thick walls).

In the roof of the church were little rooms for the inhabitants of Heerlen to take shelter in case of hostilities, unfortunately these rooms were destroyed when a, supposedly German, bomb hit the church at New Year's Eve 1944/1945.

References

See also
 List of castles in the Netherlands

Castles in South Limburg (Netherlands)
Buildings and structures in Heerlen